This is a timeline of events related to the Colombian armed conflict.

This timeline is incomplete; some important events may be missing. Please help add to it.

Background
Events that preceded the conflict.

1899
 Thousand Days War, civil war between the two ruling parties Colombian Liberal Party and Colombian Conservative Party,

1902
 End of Civil War. Tensions between parties remain.

1928
 Banana massacre in the town of Cienaga by the Colombian Army after a workers' strike against the United Fruit Company.

1948
 Death of Jorge Eliecer Gaitan triggers El Bogotazo, Liberal and Conservative violence spread as part of La Violencia.

1950s
 Marquetalia and other enclaves created by radical Liberal and Communist guerrillas.

1953
 General Gustavo Rojas Pinilla seizes power and offers an amnesty to Liberal and Conservative fighters, most of whom demobilize.

1958
The National Front created by the Liberal and Conservative parties, after mutual agreements and a December 1957 plebiscite.

1959
 U.S. President Eisenhower sent a survey team to Colombia to investigate the political situation in Colombia. As a result, the U.S.  decided to help Colombia in counter-insurgency doctrines.

Colombian armed conflict

1960s

1960
 January 11 - Jacobo Prías aka "Charro Negro", Chief of the Communist Agrarian Movement is killed. The Colombian government is blamed.

1961
 Reports of helicopters were being deployed with US instructors accompanying Colombian pilots.

1962
 A United States special warfare team, trained in Kennedy's Counterinsurgency doctrine, and headed by Gen. William Yarborough, was sent to Colombia. Following this cycles of special warfare teams arrived in Colombia between 1962 and 1965 to continue training in counterinsurgency operations
 Colombian Army military offensive against Marquetalia fails to eliminate the enclave.

1964
 Operation Soberanía (Colombia), launched by the Colombian Army simultaneously with Operation Marquetalia in southern Tolima Department.

1965
 Radical Liberal and Communist guerrillas from Marquetalia created the Southern Bloc

1966
Establishment of the Revolutionary Armed Forces of Colombia (FARC) by Jacobo Arenas and Manuel Marulanda, among others.

1970s

1971
The FARC begin kidnapping as a major source of income.

1975
FARC Kidnaps the Dutch consul in Cali Eric Leupin, demanding a US$1 million in ransom.

1976
October - FARC Dutch consul hostage is released.

1977
FARC Kidnaps a member of the United States Peace Corps.

1980s

1980
Dominican embassy siege by 19th of April Movement (M-19)

1985
Palace of Justice siege by 19th of April Movement (M-19)
Patriotic Union Party (UP)

1990s

1990
Colombian army launched Operation Centauro against the guerrillas with no significant results.

1991
Operation Casa Verde launched by the Colombian army in an attempt to combat guerrillas concentrated in the area of Uribe, Meta with operations also extending to the region of Yari.

1996
June 16 - A confrontation for coca cultivations in Norte de Santander Department between the AUC paramilitaries and the FARC results in La Gabarra Massacre.

1997
Operation Destructor launched by the Colombian army destroying numerous camp sites. According to the army there were 600 guerrilla casualties.
Mapiripán Massacre (1997)

1999
FARC-Government peace process starts
FARC released a hostage held since 1977 (22 years) after a payment of a US$250,000 dollar ransom.

2000s

2002
Bojayá massacre (2002)
Operation TH launched by the Colombian army to recover the former demilitarized zone after the failed peace process between the Pastrana government and the FARC guerrilla.

2004
Operation JM launched by the Colombian army, first of operation part of Plan Patriota.

2006
Parapolitics scandal broke out.

2008
A humanitarian exchange of important hostages and the rescue of 15 important hostages, including three Americans and Íngrid Betancourt.

2010s

2010
 January 1–18 FARC rebels are killed in a raid by the Colombian Air Force in the south while celebrating the New Year.

2011

2012

2013
 1 January – The Colombian military kills 13 FARC rebels in an airstrike.
 22 January – FARC rebels have blown up two southern oil pipelines with dynamite and planted a bomb on the top coal exporter's northern railway after the end of a ceasefire.
 9 November – A gunman opens fire on a bar in Cali and kills eight people.

2014

2015

2016

2017

2018

 5 January – Two encounters happened in southwestern Colombia, leaving at least 7 people killed. During the incident a rebel leader was shot dead.
 10 January – A Colombian soldier was shot dead by an ELN sniper in the department of Arauca.
 13 January – Militants of the ELN kidnapped a contractor of Ecopetrolun in the Departament of Arauca.
 19 January – Uniformed soldiers who were in an army base in the municipality of Teorama, Norte de Santander, were attacked in an unexpected attack by members of the ELN guerrillas. One soldier was killed and two more were injured.
 21 January – A caravan made up of members of the National Protection Unit, along with members of the FARC political party, who were returning from a meeting in the village of El Oasis, was attacked by gunfire in the department of Arauca. One of the vehicles that was part of the caravan was incinerated and a civilian who was part of an oil company in the sector was killed in the attack.
 27 January –
 At least five police officers were killed and 42 others injured in a bombing attack that targeted a police station in the northern coastal city of Barranquilla.
 In the town of Buenavista, Santa Rosa del Sur, an explosive device was hurled against the police substation in that area. The incident left two police officers dead and one injured.
 28 people were injured in an attack on a police station in San Lorenzo, in Northern Ecuador.
 28 January – At least five people were injured in an attack against the police in the metropolitan area of the Colombian city of Barranquilla.
 3 February – FARC dissidents blew up an energy tower in the southeastern Colombian department of Guaviare, which left some 22,000 people in the area without electricity.
 4 February – Armed men threw a grenade at a house in Ituango and fired repeatedly at its facade. The incident left a 3-year-old girl dead.
 10 February – The National Liberation Army (ELN) activated explosive charges that damaged a bridge and road in the department of Cesar (north), leaving no victims.
 12 February –
 Colombian soldier Jhon Jairo Delgado Bastidas was killed by guerrillas of the National Liberation Army (ELN) in the municipality of Valdivia, in the department of Antioquia.
 The railway line of Colombia's largest coal mine, Cerrejón, was attacked with explosives that caused the suspension of trains without affecting production or exports.
 13 February – A dead policeman, identified as mayor Jorge Sáenz Animero, and three civilians injured, is the result of an attack perpetrated by armed men in the capital of Arauca.
 16 February – A bomb exploded in the Paloquemao sector of Bogotá. The attack did not leave people injured.
 19 February – Two soldiers were injured in an attack by dissidents of the former Colombian FARC guerrilla against Ecuadorian soldiers on the border with Colombia.
 21 February – At least seven peasants were injured as they crossed a minefield mined by the extinct Revolutionary Armed Forces of Colombia (FARC) guerrilla when they were carrying out coca leaf plantation removal work in the Nukak natural park in the Colombian department of Guaviare.
 24 February – An attack by dissidents of the former Revolutionary Armed Forces of Colombia (FARC) guerrillas, on a police squad in the municipality of Puerto Rico in the department of Meta left one uniformed man dead and another wounded.
 25 February – Three Venezuelans died in the municipality of Tibú, department of Norte de Santander, in an attack by the ELN.
 27 February – At least five soldiers were killed and 13 wounded in a bomb attack against a Colombian army caravan in a rural area of the city of Cucuta, bordering Venezuela.
 28 February – A new assault by the ELN with gunfire and cylinder bombs, which was registered in the rural area of Convención, killed one soldier and injured four others.
 1 March – An ELN attack killed 2 soldiers and 3 others were injured in Convención.
 3 March – Two policemen were killed in an attack with explosives on the road from Caldono to Siberia in the department of Cauca.

2020s

2020

2021 

 21 January – FARC dissidents clash with Venezuelan authorities.
 3 March – A military operation kills ten FARC dissidents.

See also

Timeline of Colombian history

References

External links
BBC:Timeline of Colombia
terrorism knowledge base

Colombian conflict

Colombian conflict
Colombian conflict